Edoardo Maria Airoldi is the Millard E. Gladfelter Professor of Statistics and Data Science in the Fox School of Business at Temple University. Prior to fall 2018 he was an associate professor in the Department of Statistics at Harvard University, where he founded and directed the Harvard Laboratory for Applied Statistics & Data Science, until spring 2017. Additionally, he held visiting positions at MIT and Yale University. His work is primarily in statistics and machine learning.

Recognition
Airoldi was elected as a Fellow of the Institute of Mathematical Statistics in 2019, and as a Fellow of the American Statistical Association in 2020.

References

External links
 Edoardo M Airoldi profile at Harvard Faculty of Arts and Sciences
 Edoardo M Airoldi profile at Fox School of Business and Management
 

1974 births
Bocconi University alumni
Living people
American statisticians
Harvard University faculty
Carnegie Mellon University alumni
Temple University faculty
Fellows of the American Statistical Association
Mathematical statisticians